Brothers: A Tale of Two Sons is a 2013 adventure game developed by Starbreeze Studios and published by 505 Games for Xbox 360, Microsoft Windows, PlayStation 3, PlayStation 4, Xbox One, iOS, Android, Windows Phone, Nintendo Switch, and Amazon Luna. The narrative takes place in a fantasy world filled with fictitious creatures such as orcs and trolls, where two young brothers set out on a journey to find a cure for their father's illness. The game is often mentioned an example of artistry in video games due to its heavy narrative. It has sold more than 800,000 copies as of January 2015.

Gameplay 
Brothers: A Tale of Two Sons is presented from a third-person view overlooking the two brothers. The brothers are moved individually by two thumbsticks on the controller. The controller triggers cause the respective brother to interact with the game world, such as talking to a non-player character or grabbing onto a ledge or object. The older brother is the stronger of the two and can pull levers or boost his younger brother to higher spaces, while the younger one can pass between narrow bars. The player progresses by manipulating the two brothers at the same time to complete various puzzles, often requiring the player to manipulate both brothers to perform differing functions (such as one distracting a hostile non-player character while the other makes his way around). Should either brother fall from a great height or get injured, the game restarts at a recent checkpoint. All of the in-game dialogue is spoken in a fictional language based on Lebanese Arabic, thus the story is conveyed through actions, gestures and expressions.

Plot 
The story begins with a boy named Naiee standing at the tombstone of his dead mother, who drowned at sea while he was unable to save her. His older brother, Naia, calls him to help their ill father reach the village's doctor, who in turn tells them the only way to save him is by collecting the water from the Tree of Life. The brothers embark on their journey through the village, hills and mountains, while facing challenges like the local bully, a farmer's aggressive dog, and deadly wolves. They help others along the way – reuniting a troll couple, saving a man attempting suicide, and aiding an inventor.

The brothers save a girl from being sacrificed by tribesmen. The girl assists them on their journey, and begins seducing Naia, tricking the brothers to enter a cave, much to Naiee's dismay. Once inside, she reveals herself as a monstrous spider creature and while trying to eat Naia, the brothers manage to thwart and kill her by pulling off her legs but not before she mortally wounds and stabs Naia. Nearing the end of their journey, the brothers reach the Tree of Life; Naia insists that Naiee venture on to reach the top of the tree. He collects the Water of Life, but as he returns to the bottom, he finds that Naia has already died from his injury. Unable to revive him using the water, Naiee buries and grieves for his older brother before returning to the village.

Upon reaching the shoreline, Naiee must face his inability to swim in order to get the waters to his dying father. His mother's spirit appears to comfort and motivate him, and with Naia's spiritual guidance, Naiee is able to force himself to swim to the village. He is able to give the doctor the water, and the father recovers from his illness overnight. A short time afterwards, Naiee and his father mourn at the tombstones of both the mother and Naia.

Development 
Brothers: A Tale of Two Sons was developed by Starbreeze Studios and was the first game to come from the publishing partnership with 505 Games. During development, its working title was P13. The game uses Unreal Engine 3,
and was developed in collaboration with Swedish-Lebanese award-winning film director Josef Fares.

Starbreeze sold the Brothers: A Tale of Two Sons intellectual property to 505 Games for $500,000 in January 2015. 505 Games continued developing the game for additional platforms, including the PlayStation 4 and Xbox One released in mid-2015, with director's commentary, the soundtrack, and a concept art gallery. Mobile versions of the game were also released; the iOS version was released on 22 October, while the Android version of the game was released on 26 May 2016.

505 Games developed a version for the Nintendo Switch released on 28 May 2019. This version includes a special two-player co-operative mode where each player controls one of the two brothers in the game. The game was released for Amazon Luna on 20 October 2020. Super Rare Games announced a limited physical release of the Switch version, which was made available on March 25, 2021.

Reception

Critical response

Brothers: A Tale of Two Sons received universal acclaim on PC and generally favorable reviews on other consoles, according to the review aggregation website Metacritic.

IGN said that Brothers: A Tale of Two Sons "might be the best downloadable title since Journey". GamesMaster James Nouch said his preview of the game that "[Brothers: A Tale of Two Sons] is a charming, emotive adventure that flows at its own rather sedate pace", but in their final review GamesMaster gave it a 91/100 writing: "Short but immensely satisfying, it's Ico meets Limbo in Fables world. In a word: spellbinding". Edge gave it a 7/10 in its review. It praised the visual style, pace and story, as well as the controls, saying that the control scheme "understands what it means to communicate meaning through interaction", but it criticized Starbreeze's lack of confidence in making an art game. UK's GamesTM magazine gave Brothers: A Tale of Two Sons a score of 8/10 in its review in issue 137.

Joystiq gave it full score in its review, 5/5. Joystiq's Ludwig Kietzmann says: "It's rare for a game to forge a connection so strong, and even rarer for you to become the connective tissue". Official Xbox Magazine UK praised the game and its touching story and inventive controls. They gave it a score of 9/10.

Both IGN and PC Gamer stated Brothers: A Tale of Two Sons was one of the best games of 2013. IGN states this with "it's no secret that we love Journey. It was our Game of the Year for 2012, after all. And we quite love Fable too [...]. So to combine the two into one cinematic, story-driven experience – one written and directed by a decorated Swedish filmmaker – meant our interest was piqued. And after we saw the game, we knew: this is going to be good. Really, really good". PC Gamer said "this could easily shape up to be one of the indie darlings of 2013". The game won the "Best Innovation" award while nominated for "Best Family Game" and "Best Story" at the 2014 BAFTA Video Games Awards.

Sales
As of January 2015, the game has sold 800,000 copies.

Awards
Brothers: A Tale of Two Sons won the award for Best Xbox Game at the 2013 VGX Award Show (formerly Spike Video Game Awards; VGAs), in competition with Grand Theft Auto V, BioShock Infinite, and Tomb Raider. It also won the Best Game Innovation Award at 2014's British Academy Games Awards (BAFTA).

References

External links 

2013 video games
505 Games games
Adventure games
Android (operating system) games
Fantasy video games
Indie video games
IOS games
Nintendo Switch games
PlayStation 3 games
PlayStation 4 games
PlayStation Network games
Starbreeze Studios games
Unreal Engine games
Video games about siblings
Video games developed in Sweden
Video games scored by Gustaf Grefberg
Windows games
Windows Phone games
Xbox 360 games
Xbox 360 Live Arcade games
Xbox One games
British Academy Games Award for Technical Achievement winners
Spike Video Game Award winners
Multiplayer and single-player video games